The 1967–68 Nationalliga A season was the 30th season of the Nationalliga A, the top level of ice hockey in Switzerland. Eight teams participated in the league, and HC La Chaux-de-Fonds won the championship.

Standings

External links 
 Championnat de Suisse 1967/68

National League (ice hockey) seasons
Swiss
1967–68 in Swiss ice hockey